Bečov is a municipality and village in Most District in the Ústí nad Labem Region of the Czech Republic. It has about 1,400 inhabitants.

Administrative parts
Villages of Milá and Zaječice are administrative parts of Bečov.

References

Villages in Most District